Jamua is a village in the Bihiya block of Bhojpur district in Bihar, India. As of 2011, its population was 2,308, in 306 households. It is located just northwest of the town of Bihiya.

References 

Villages in Bhojpur district, India